The Dean of Down is based in The Cathedral Church of the Holy and Undivided Trinity, Downpatrick within the Diocese of Down and Dromore of the Church of Ireland.

The current incumbent is T. Henry Hull.

Deans of Down

1541 Connor Magennis
1609–1622 John Gibson
1623–1627 Robert Dawson (afterwards Bishop of Clonfert and Kilmacduagh, 1627)
1627–1635 Henry Leslie (afterwards Bishop of Down and Connor, 1635
1635 William Coote (died before 1657)
1661/2 Thomas Bayly (afterwards Archdeacon of Connor, 1663 and then Bishop of Killala and Achonry, 1664)
1663/4–1669 Daniel Witter (afterwards Bishop of Killaloe
1669–1681/2 William Sheridan (afterwards Bishop of Kilmore and Ardagh, 1682)
1682–1682 Benjamin Phipps
1682/3–1709 John M'Neale
1709–1717 Ralph Lambert (afterwards Bishop of Dromore, 1717)
1717–1721 Benjamin Pratt
1721/2–1723 Charles Fairfax
1723/4–1731 William Gore
1731/2–1739 Richard Daniel
1739–1744 Thomas Fletcher (afterwards Bishop of Dromore, 1744)
1744–1768 Patrick Delany
1768–1787 James Dickson
1787–1817 Hon William Annesley
1817–1831 Edmund Knox (afterwards Bishop of Killaloe and Kilfenora, 1831)
1831–1839 Thomas Plunket (afterwards Bishop of Tuam, Killala and Achonry, 1839)
1839–1855 Theophilus Blakely
1856–1876 Thomas Woodward
1876–1887 Edward Busteed Moeran
1887–1912 Edward Maguire
1912–1923 John Pierce Brown
1923–1938 William Patrick Carmody
1938–1945 Cyril Elliott (afterwards Dean of Belfast, 1945)
1945–1954 Frederick Hatch
1955–1963 Walter Horatio Good
1964–1968 Alfred Weller Mussen Stanley Mann
1968–1980 Robert William Thomas Howard Kilpatrick
1980–?1987 John Herbert Rosmund Good
1987–1996 Hamilton Leckey
1997–2006 John Frederick Dinnen
2006–present Thomas Henry Hull

References

 
Diocese of Down and Dromore
Down